Fulganco Cardozo (born 23 January 1988), sometimes incorrectly referred to as "Fulgencio Cardozo", is an Indian footballer who currently plays for Dempo in the I-League and India national football team as a centre back.

International career
Carodozo made his debut for India when he was substituted for another debutant, Keegan Pereira, in the second half against Laos on 7 June 2016. He was 509th player to represent India. He scored his first goal for the India in the same match in 87th minute.

International statistics

International goals
As of match played 7 June 2016. India score listed first, score column indicates score after each Cardozo goal.

Career statistics

Club

Honours

Chennaiyin
 Indian Super League: 2017–18

References

External links
 Profile at Goal.com
 

Indian footballers
1988 births
Living people
I-League players
Vasco SC players
Sporting Clube de Goa players
Salgaocar FC players
India international footballers
Association football central defenders
Footballers from Goa